Det støver stadig is a 1962 Danish comedy film directed by Poul Bang and starring Helle Virkner.

Cast
 Helle Virkner – Fru Henriksen
 Søren Elung Jensen – Hr. Henriksen
 Dirch Passer – Alf Thomsen
 Hanne Borchsenius – Frk. Monalisa Jacobsen
 Henrik Wiehe – Hr. Johansen
 Bodil Udsen – Fru Hansen
 Ove Sprogøe – Thorbjørn Hansen
 Karl Stegger – Hr. Feddersen
 Solveig Sundborg – Fru Feddersen
 Beatrice Palner – Fru Svendsen
 Henning Palner – Hr. Svendsen
 Olaf Ussing – Borgmesteren
 Gunnar Lemvigh – T. Eliassen
 Paul Hagen – Fotograf
 Judy Gringer – Model
 Gunnar Bigum – Kunde hos Feddersen
 Asbjørn Andersen – Redaktøren
 Ellen Malberg
 Bettina Heltberg – Klinikassistent
 Edith Hermansen
 Einar Reim – Doctor Krogh
 Pierre Miehe-Renard
 Bente Weischenfeldt
 Ulla Darni
 Lene Bro – Fotomodel
 Ebba Amfeldt – Dame på posthus

External links

1962 films
1962 comedy films
1960s Danish-language films
Films directed by Poul Bang
Films scored by Sven Gyldmark
Danish comedy films